Cynthiana is a home rule-class city in Harrison County, Kentucky, in the United States. The population was 6,402 at the 2010 census. It is the seat of its county.

History
The settlement developed on both sides of the South Fork of the Licking River. It was named after Cynthia and Anna Harrison, daughters of Robert Harrison, who had donated land to establish the town center. Harrison County, on the other hand, was named after Colonel Benjamin Harrison, an early settler in the area who had served as sheriff of Bourbon County.

Two Civil War battles were fought in Cynthiana. The first on July 17, 1862, was part of a cavalry raid into Kentucky (which stayed in the Union) by Confederate General John Hunt Morgan; the second, on June 11 and 12, 1864, resulted in Union defeat of Confederate forces during Morgan's last raid into the state.

On January 23, 1877, an LL chondrite meteorite fell in Cynthiana.

On March 2, 1997, the South Fork of the Licking River flooded, causing extensive damage in Cynthiana and neighboring communities.

In early March 2020, near the beginning of the COVID-19 pandemic in the United States, Cynthiana was reported to have the first case of the disease diagnosed in Kentucky. Four more cases soon followed, and by March 12, most businesses, schools and churches closed in an effort to prevent further spread.

Geography
Cynthiana is located in southern Harrison County at  (38.388292, -84.296841). U.S. Routes 27 and 62 pass through the city, passing west of the downtown area. US 27 leads north  to Cincinnati and south  to Paris, while US 62 leads northeast  to Maysville and southwest  to Georgetown.

The South Fork of the Licking River, a tributary of the Ohio River, flows south to north through the city, passing west of the downtown area.

Climate
The climate in this area is characterized by hot, humid summers and generally mild to cool winters.  According to the Köppen Climate Classification system, Cynthiana has a humid subtropical climate, abbreviated "Cfa" on climate maps.

Transportation

U.S. Highways
 US 27 is known otherwise as Paris Pike (going south from Cynthiana), and Falmouth Road (going north from Cynthiana).
 US 62 is known otherwise as Leesburg Rd (going west from Cynthiana), and Oddville Pike (going east from Cynthiana).

Kentucky state highways
 KY 36 is also known locally as Williamstown Road (west of Cynthiana) and Millersburg Pike (east of Cynthiana).
 KY 32 is also known locally as Connersville Pike (southwest of Cynthiana) and Millersburg Pike (east of Cynthiana). KY 32 and KY 36 merge downtown and leave Cynthiana concurrently.
 KY 356 is also known as White Oak Road.

Education
Cynthiana is served by the Harrison County School District with a total of seven public schools located within the county limits:

 High schools:
Harrison County High School
 Technical Schools
KY Tech Harrison Area Technology Center (ATC)
 Middle schools:
Harrison County Middle School
 Elementary schools:
Eastside Elementary
Westside Elementary
Northside Elementary
Southside Elementary

Cynthiana has one private school:
St. Edward School (Pre-k-5)

Maysville Community and Technical College has an extended campus located in Cynthiana
 Maysville Community and Technical College: Licking Valley Campus

Cynthiana has a public library, the Cynthiana-Harrison Public Library.

Demographics

As of the census of 2000, there were 6,258 people, 2,692 households, and 1,639 families residing in the city. The racial makeup of the city was 92.43% White, 5.29% Black or African American, 0.16% Native American, 0.18% Asian, 0.05% Pacific Islander, 0.81% from other races, and 1.09% from two or more races. Hispanic or Latino of any race were 1.41% of the population.

There were 2,692 households, out of which 27.3% had children under the age of 18 living with them, 42.2% were married couples living together, 14.9% had a female householder with no husband present, and 39.1% were non-families. 36.0% of all households were made up of individuals, and 18.7% had someone living alone who was 65 years of age or older. The average household size was 2.24 and the average family size was 2.89.

In the city, the population was spread out, with 22.7% under the age of 18, 9.0% from 18 to 24, 26.3% from 25 to 44, 21.9% from 45 to 64, and 20.1% who were 65 years of age or older. The median age was 40 years. For every 100 females, there were 80.9 males. For every 100 females age 18 and over, there were 77.3 males.

The median income for a household in the city was $28,519, and the median income for a family was $34,691. Males had a median income of $27,704 versus $20,659 for females. The per capita income for the city was $15,227. About 13.3% of families and 16.1% of the population were below the poverty line, including 23.1% of those under age 18 and 11.7% of those age 65 or over.

Economy
3M established a factory in Cynthiana in 1969. Post-it notes were developed in 1972 by Arthur Fry and Spencer Silver. Until patents expired in the late 1990s, the 3M factory in Cynthiana was the only production site of Post-it notes worldwide. Today, it still accounts for nearly all of the world's production.

Media

Newspaper

The Cynthiana Democrat, owned by Landmark Community Newspaper Inc.
Subscription-based weekly newspaper, printed every Thursday with in-home delivery.
Has been in print since 1868. Also is available at www.cynthianademocrat.com

Radio

Notable people
 William A. Welch, civil engineer, environmentalist, and first general manager of the Palisades Interstate Park system
 Celia Ammerman, model and star of America's Next Top Model (cycle 12)
 William Tell Coleman, founder of the Harmony Borax Works, Death Valley, California
 Richard Gruelle, painter and member of the Hoosier Group
 Joe B. Hall, University of Kentucky men's basketball coach 1972–85; coached Wildcats to 1978 national championship
 Robert Kirkman, comic book writer, co-creator of The Walking Dead
 William McKinney, jazz drummer and bandleader
 Tony Moore, comic book artist
 Betty Pariso, IFBB professional bodybuilder
 Fredrick G. Prahl, Emeritus Professor of Organic Geochemistry at Oregon State University
 Lawrence Pressman, actor
 Anna Rankin Riggs (1835–1908), social reformer
 Pythias Russ, baseball player in the Negro leagues
 Walter E. Scott, namesake of Death Valley National Park's Scotty's Castle
 Marcus A. Smith, United States Senator from Arizona
 Chris Snopek, Major League Baseball player
 Mac Swinford, federal judge
 Phil Wagner, retired American professional basketball player who spent one season (1968–69) in the American Basketball Association for the Indiana Pacers
 Justin Wells, country and roots rock musician 
 Caleb Walton West, last governor of Utah Territory

In popular culture
In the film Blues Brothers 2000, The Blues Brothers band goes to Cynthiana Kentucky to perform a bluegrass concert, where they perform the song  Ghost Riders in the Sky. 
In the comic book series The Walking Dead, the main character, Sheriff's Deputy Rick Grimes, wakes up in a nearby abandoned hospital to discover that his hometown of Cynthiana has been overrun with zombies and nearly the entire town's population has been killed or evacuated.

References

External links

 City of Cynthiana official website

Cities in Kentucky
Cities in Harrison County, Kentucky
County seats in Kentucky